The 1971 Little League World Series took place between August 24 and August 28 in Williamsport, Pennsylvania. The Tainan Little League of Tainan City, Taiwan, defeated the Anderson Little League of Gary, Indiana, in the championship game of the 25th Little League World Series.

This was the first championship game that was decided in extra innings, and remains the longest championship game in LLWS history, at nine innings.

Teams

Championship bracket

Consolation bracket

Notable players
 Lloyd McClendon of the Gary, Indiana, team went on to play in MLB as an outfielder from 1987 to 1994, and later a career as a coach and manager. He was inducted to the Little League Hall of Excellence in 2006.  He went 5 for 5 with 5 home runs during the LLWS while getting walked in all other plate appearances.

References

External links
1971 Little League World Series
Line scores for the 1971 LLWS

Little League World Series
Little League World Series
Little League World Series